Peter Howard Selz (March 27, 1919 – June 21, 2019) was a German-born American art historian and museum director and curator who specialized in German Expressionism.

Biography
Peter Selz was born in Munich of Jewish parents. In 1936, aged 17, he fled Nazi Germany because his parents wanted to send him to study in the United States. His family managed to escape Germany just before the Night of Broken Glass, with the help of some nuns, whom his optometrist father had treated for free. He spent one year at Columbia University and discovered that he was distantly related to Alfred Stieglitz, who became his mentor. After serving in World War II he received an A.M. from the University of Chicago on the GI Bill in 1949. He received several Fulbright scholarships in the following years to study at the University of Paris and École du Louvre as well as the Musées Royaux d'Art et d'Histoire; at the same time, Selz was teaching at the University of Chicago and also chaired the education department at the Institute of Design at the Illinois Institute of Technology in Chicago. In 1955 he moved to Pomona College to chair the art department and serve as director of the school's art gallery.

In 1958, Selz became the curator of department of painting and sculpture exhibitions at the Museum of Modern Art in New York. His first exhibition at the Modern was the influential "New Images of Man" in 1959, which included paintings by Karel Appel, Francis Bacon, Richard Diebenkorn, Jean Dubuffet, Leon Golub, Balcomb Greene, Willem de Kooning, Rico Lebrun, James McGarrell, Jan Muller, Nathan Oliveira, and Jackson Pollock and sculpture by Dubuffet, Kenneth Armitage, Leonard Baskin, Reg Butler, Cosmo Campoli, César, Eduardo Paolozzi, Germaine Richier, Theodore Roszak, H.C. Westermann, and Fritz Wotruba. In 1961, he invited Mark Rothko to show panels created commissioned by Phillip Johnson for the Four Seasons Restaurant in the Seagram Building. Rothko withdrew from the commission and the panels became the basis for the MoMA exhibit.  Subsequent major exhibitions curated by Selz included Jean Tinguely's kinetic, self-destroying sculpture "Homage to New York"; the first Rodin retrospective in the United States; and a comprehensive 1965 exhibition of work by Alberto Giacometti.

Selz served as Professor of Art History at the University of California, Berkeley from 1965 to 1988; at the same time, he served as the founding director of the Berkeley Art Museum from 1965 to 1973. Selz brought an unorthodox and irreverent approach to his selection of artists. His daughter Gabrielle says in a 2014 interview that while he "came out to Berkeley just as Pop and Conceptual Art were ascending on the East Coast," Selz turned away from these popular movements and instead "identified with the irreverence of styles like Funk art," seeking to highlight the work of "ceramic artists like Peter Voulkos [who] were barely considered fine artists then" or Nathan Oliveira, "a figurative artist who did not follow the prevailing east coast trends."

In 1976, Selz served as project director for Christo’s Running Fence, a 24.5-mile long fabric fence installed in the Marin County hills.

Selz died in Albany, California, on June 21, 2019, at the age of 100.

Selected bibliography
 German Expressionist Painting. Berkeley, CA: University of California Press, 1957
 Emil Nolde. New York: Museum of Modern Art/Doubleday, 1963
 Alberto Giacometti. New York:  Museum of Modern Art, New York/Art Institute of Chicago/Doubleday, 1965
 Directions in Kinetic Sculpture. Berkeley: University Art Museum [and] the Committee for Arts and Lectures, University of California, 1966 (with George Rickey) 
 Theories of Modern Art: a Source Book by Artists and Critics. Berkeley: University of California Press, 1968 ( with Hershel B. Chipp and Joshua Taylor)
 Ferdinand Hodler. Berkeley: University Art Museum, 1972 (with Jura Brüschweiler, Phyllis Hattis, and Eva Wyler)
 Art in a Turbulent Era. Ann Arbor, MI: UMI Press, 1985
 Art in Our Times: A Pictorial History. New York: Abrams, 1981
 Beyond the Mainstream: Essays on Modern and Contemporary Art. New York: Cambridge University Press, 1997.

References

External links
 Oral history interview with Peter Howard Selz. Interview with Selz conducted November 3, 1999 by Paul J. Karlstrom for the Archives of American Art.

1919 births
2019 deaths
American centenarians
German art historians
German centenarians
Men centenarians
Illinois Institute of Technology faculty
Pomona College faculty
University of California, Berkeley faculty
University of Chicago alumni
University of Chicago faculty
Jewish emigrants from Nazi Germany to the United States
Jewish American historians
American military personnel of World War II
Historians from California
21st-century American Jews